Lipocosma intermedialis is a moth in the family Crambidae first described by William Barnes and James Halliday McDunnough in 1912. It is found in North America, where it has been recorded from Texas and Maryland.

References

Moths described in 1912
Glaphyriinae